Kristin Gundred, known professionally as Kristin Kontrol, is an American musician, singer and songwriter. She is best known as founder and lead singer of indie rock band Dum Dum Girls (using the pseudonym Dee Dee), with whom she released five studio albums between 2010 and 2014.

She began working on new material in 2015, and announced Kristin Kontrol as her new solo project on January 28, 2016. Her debut album, X-Communicate, was released on May 27, 2016 on Sub Pop Records. It was a departure from the sound she had explored with Dum Dum Girls, leaning towards synthpop. The album was met with favorable reviews.

On September 21, 2017, she released the digital single "Concrete Love".

Gundred is vegan and has collaborated with the cruelty-free cosmetics company Reverie.

In 2017, she and bandmate/producer Andrew Miller scored the Tim Hunter-directed film Looking Glass, starring Nicolas Cage. In 2018, she scored the Bret Easton Ellis-penned film Smiley Face Killers.

Under the Dee Dee moniker, she formed a band called OCDPP with Cassie Ramone from Vivian Girls and OJ from XRay Eyeballs. Their first performance was in 2015, and they released an EP called 7" Long Player in 2020.

Discography

Albums

Singles

References

External Links
 kristingundred.com
 Twitter @kristinkontrol

American rock musicians
American singer-songwriters
Living people
Place of birth missing (living people)
Year of birth missing (living people)
American women in electronic music
21st-century American women